Nicolas Raffort (born 27 June 1991) is a French former World Cup alpine ski racer who specialized in the speed events of downhill and super-G.

Biography
On January 25, 2019, he finished 14th in the Kitzbühel World Cup downhill on the Streif 4 track, which is his best result in the World Cup to date. He is engaged to Italian skier Federica Brignone.

References

External links
Nicolas Raffort at the International Ski Federation

Living people
1991 births
French male alpine skiers
21st-century French people